Atlantic Coast Line 501 is an EMC E3 diesel locomotive built in November 1939 for the Atlantic Coast Line Railroad. It was notable for being the sole EMC E3 survivor, though it was rebuilt into an E6 before delivery.

The locomotive spent its career pulling the Champion. In the 1980s, the engine operated on the Wisconsin Western Railroad, a short-lived heritage railway. It is currently operating at the North Carolina Transportation Museum in Spencer, North Carolina.

References

Atlantic Coast Line Railroad
Electro-Motive Division locomotives
A1A-A1A locomotives
Preserved diesel locomotives
Individual locomotives of the United States